Oppo Find X3 Series are Android-based smartphones manufactured by Oppo, succeeding the Find X2 Series

Specifications

Design 
The Find X3 and Find X3 Pro use anodized aluminum for the frame, while the display is protected by Gorilla Glass 5 which is curved around the edges. The back panel is manufactured from a single piece of glass, with a contoured camera protrusion housing four rear cameras and the dual-LED flash. Both phones have IP68 water resistance; color options are Gloss Black, Blue and White.

Hardware 
The Find X3 and Find X3 Pro use the Snapdragon 870 and Snapdragon 888 processors respectively. Both devices offer UFS 3.1 with no expandable storage. The Find X3 has 128 GB or 256 GB paired with 8 GB of RAM, while the Find X3 Pro has 256 GB paired with 8 or 12 GB of RAM. Both feature a 6.7-inch (170 mm) LTPO AMOLED display of 1440p resolution with an adaptive 120Hz refresh rate. The display has HDR10+ support, and is capable of showing over 1 billion colors. The battery capacity is 4500 mAh; wired fast charging is supported at 65 W, and wireless charging at 30 W. Both phones include Dolby Atmos stereo speakers with active noise cancellation, but no audio jack. Biometric options include an optical fingerprint scanner and facial recognition.

Camera 
The Find X3 and Find X3 Pro have identical camera setups. The 50 MP Sony IMX766 is utilized for the wide and ultrawide sensors, featuring native 10-bit color capture. The telephoto sensor has a 13 MP sensor with 2x optical zoom. New to the Find X3 series is a 3 MP microlens advertised with up to 60x magnification. The front camera remains unchanged, using a 32 MP sensor.

Software 
The Find X3 and Find X3 Pro run on ColorOS 11.2, which is based on no smart cover Android 11.

References

External links

 

Find X3
Android (operating system) devices
Mobile phones introduced in 2021
Mobile phones with multiple rear cameras
Mobile phones with 4K video recording
Flagship smartphones